Ryan Cowden (born 1979) is an American football executive and former player who is currently the vice president of player personnel for the Tennessee Titans of the National Football League (NFL). He played college football at Wofford and has also served as a scout with the Carolina Panthers. In , he was the Titans' interim general manager.

Early life and education
Cowden attended Lebanon High School in Virginia where he was one of the state's top multi-sport athletes, playing football as a quarterback, baseball as an outfielder, basketball as a point guard and track and field. He was a three-year starter in football and compiled an overall record of 30–6, leading them to the Region C, Division 2 championship in 1994 where they lost 34–33, in what was considered one of the greatest games in Southwest Virginia history.

Cowden later attended Wofford College and played strong safety on their football team. As a senior in 1999, he recorded a total of 59 tackles, placing third on the team, and was the holder for kicks, throwing in that position a 29-yard touchdown on a fake field goal. He received a degree in finance when he graduated.

Executive career
In , after graduating from Wofford, Cowden was hired by the Carolina Panthers as a scouting assistant. He had worked at a fireworks store on Asheville Highway before receiving the job with Carolina.

In that position, he oversees the entire scouting department and assists with collegiate scouting, as well as helping prepare the team for the NFL Draft. After Jon Robinson was fired as general manager of the Titans in December , Cowden was named interim replacement.

Cowden has been previously interviewed for the general manager position by the Kansas City Chiefs (in ), the Carolina Panthers (in ), the Washington Commanders (then known as the Washington Football Team, in ), the New York Giants (in ), and the Pittsburgh Steelers (in ).

References

1979 births
Living people
Players of American football from Virginia
American football quarterbacks
American football safeties
Wofford Terriers football players
Carolina Panthers executives
Tennessee Titans executives